The Cozumel coati (Nasua narica nelsoni), or Cozumel Island coati, is a coati from the Mexican island of Cozumel, in the Caribbean Sea. It is in the family Procyonidae, which also includes raccoons, olingos, and kinkajous.

Taxonomy
It has been treated as a species, but the vast majority of recent authorities treat it as a subspecies of the white-nosed coati. Cozumel Island coatis are slightly smaller than the white-nosed coatis of the adjacent mainland (N. n. yucatanica); but, when compared more widely to white-nosed coatis, the difference in size is not as clear. The level of other differences also support its status as a subspecies rather than a separate species.

It has been speculated that it is the result of an ancient introduction to Cozumel by the Mayans. Although not rated by the IUCN (where included in the widespread white-nosed coati), it is believed that the Cozumel Island coati is highly threatened and close to extinction.

Gallery

References

External links

Procyonidae
Coati, Cozumel
Coati, Cozumel
Coati, Cozumel
Coati, Cozumel
Coati, Cozumel
Taxa named by Clinton Hart Merriam
Mammals described in 1901